Lepthoplosternum altamazonicum is a species of catfish of the family Callichthyidae. It is found in the upper Amazon River basin in Peru and Brazil,

References
 

Callichthyidae
Freshwater fish of South America
Freshwater fish of Brazil
Freshwater fish of Peru
Taxa named by Roberto Esser dos Reis
Fish described in 1997